Reuben Archer Torrey (28 January 1856 – 26 October 1928) was an American evangelist, pastor, educator, and writer. He aligned with Keswick theology.

Biography
Torrey was born in Hoboken, New Jersey, the son of a banker. He graduated from Yale University in 1875 and from Yale Divinity School in 1878, following which he became a Congregational minister in Garrettsville, Ohio. In 1879, he married Clara Smith, and they subsequently had five children.

After further studies in theology at Leipzig University and Erlangen University in 1882–1883, Torrey joined Dwight L. Moody in his evangelistic work in Chicago in 1889, and became superintendent of the Bible Institute of the Chicago Evangelization Society (now Moody Bible Institute). In 1894, he became pastor of the Chicago Avenue Church (now the Moody Church).
 
In 1898, Torrey served as a chaplain with the YMCA at Camp Chickamauga during the Spanish–American War. During World War I, he performed similar service at Camp Bowie (a POW camp in Texas) and at Camp Kearny.

In 1902–1903, he preached in nearly every part of the English-speaking world and with song leader Charles McCallon Alexander conducted revival services in Great Britain from 1903 to 1905. During this period, he also visited China, Japan, Australia, and India. Torrey conducted a similar campaign in American and Canadian cities in 1906–1907. Throughout these campaigns, Torrey used a meeting style that he borrowed from Moody's campaigns of the 1870s.

In 1912, Torrey was persuaded to build another institution like Moody Bible Institute, and from 1912 to 1924, he served as Dean of the Bible Institute of Los Angeles (now Biola University) and contributed to the BIOLA publication, The King's Business. Beginning in 1915, he served as the first pastor of the Church of the Open Door, Los Angeles. Torrey was one of the three editors of The Fundamentals, a 12-volume series that gave its name to what came to be called "fundamentalism".

Torrey held his last evangelistic meeting in Florida in 1927, additional meetings being canceled because of his failing health. He died at home in Asheville, North Carolina, on October 26, 1928, having preached throughout the world and written more than 40 books. 
He was 72 years old.

Honors

In 1907, he accepted an honorary doctorate from Wheaton College. Torrey-Gray Auditorium, the main auditorium at Moody, was named for Torrey and his successor, James M. Gray. At Biola, the Torrey Honors Institute honors him, as does the university's annual Bible conference.

Bibliography
How to Bring Men to Christ, (E-text) (1893)
Baptism with the Holy Spirit, (E-text) (1895)
How to Study the Bible with Greatest Profit, (E-text) (1896)
How to Obtain Fullness of Power in Christian Life and Service (1897)
How to Pray, (E-text)
What the Bible Teaches, (1898)
Divine Origin of the Bible, (1899)
How to Promote and Conduct a Successful Revival, (1901)
How to Work for Christ, (1901)
Revival Addresses, (E-text) (1903)
Talks to Men About the Bible and the Christ of the Bible, (1904)
The Bible and Its Christ: Being Noonday Talks with Business Men on Faith and Unbelief (1906)
Difficulties in the Bible, (1907)
Studies in the Life and Teachings of our Lord, (1909)
The Higher Criticism and the New Theology (1911)
The Fundamentals: a Testimony to the Truth Editor, (four volumes) 
The Person and Work of the Holy Spirit (E-Text) (1910)
The Baptism with the Holy Spirit
The Holy Spirit: Who He Is and What He Does and How to Know Him in All the Fulness of His Gracious and Glorious Ministry
The Importance and Value of Proper Bible Study, (E-text)
Why God Used D. L. Moody, (1923) (modern reprint by CrossReach Publications, 2016)
The Voice of God in the Present Hour (1917)
Is the Bible the Inerrant Word of God?: And was the Body of Jesus Raised from the Dead? (1922)
The Power of Prayer and the Prayer of Power, (1924)
The Bible, the Peerless Book: Gods Own Book and Gods Only Book (1925)
How to Succeed in the Christian Life, (E-text)
The Gospel for Today
Real Salvation and Whole-Hearted Service
The Fundamental Doctrines of the Christian Faith, (E-text)
Torrey's Topical Textbook
Treasury of Scripture Knowledge

References

Further reading

Short biographical info

Entry in New Schaff-Herzog Encyclopedia of Religious Knowledge
Martin, Roger: R. A. Torrey: Apostle of Certainty. Sword of the Lord Publishers, 1976. .

External links

Difficulties in the Bible, book by R. A. Torrey.
R. A. Torrey Archive (sermons and writings)
R. A. Torrey hymn "Bless Thou Jehovah" with new melody by Eric M. Pazdziora
R. A. Torrey's New Topical Textbook
Torrey Honors Institute
Ten Reasons Why I Believe The Bible Is The Word Of God by R. A. Torrey
The Fundamentals: A Testimony to the Truth, edited by R.A. Torrey (1910–15)
How to Pray by R. A. Torrey
Treasury Of Scripture Knowledge – Torrey's Bible study reference tool.

1856 births
1928 deaths
19th-century American male writers
19th-century Congregationalist ministers
20th-century American male writers
20th-century Congregationalist ministers
American Christian theologians
American Congregationalist ministers
American evangelicals
American military chaplains
American people of the Spanish–American War
American people of World War I
American sermon writers
Biola University faculty
Christian fundamentalists
Christian revivalists
Congregationalist writers
Erlangen University alumni
Keswickianism
Leipzig University alumni
Moody Bible Institute people
People from Portage County, Ohio
Spanish–American War chaplains
Wheaton College (Illinois) alumni
World War I chaplains
Writers from Hoboken, New Jersey
Yale Divinity School alumni